Park Yong-joon (born 21 June 1993) is a South Korean professional footballer who plays for  Perlis FA in the Malaysia Premier League. He represented South Korea U-20 at 2013 FIFA U-20 World Cup.

References

1993 births
Living people
South Korean footballers
South Korean expatriate footballers
Suwon Samsung Bluewings players
Perlis FA players
Bucheon FC 1995 players
K League 1 players
K League 2 players
Expatriate footballers in Cambodia
South Korean expatriate sportspeople in Cambodia
Association football midfielders
Nagaworld FC players